Dielkirchen is a municipality in the Donnersbergkreis district, in Rhineland-Palatinate, Germany. Dielkirchen has an area of 8.10 km² and a population of 453 (as of December 31, 2020).

References

Municipalities in Rhineland-Palatinate
Donnersbergkreis